The 2009 Pittsburgh Pirates season was the 128th season of the franchise and the 123rd in the National League. This was their ninth season at PNC Park. The season is the franchise's second season under the management of John Russell. With this season, the Pirates became the first franchise in professional sports to have a losing record in 17 consecutive seasons, passing the Philadelphia Phillies of 1933–1948 with 16. The Pirates finished sixth and last in the National League Central with a record of 62–99. The Pirates were attempting to improve on their 2008 record, and conquer a winning record and make it to the playoffs for the first time since 1992. However, after going 11-10 in April, the Pirates suffered losing streaks. After an 8 game losing streak on May 3–10, the Pirates never reached above the .500 mark again, and failed to reach their goal.

Off-season
The organization fired pitching coach Jeff Andrews and first-base coach Lou Frazier the day after the 2008 season concluded, but are expected to retain the rest of the staff through 2009. In October 2008, Joe Kerrigan—previously of the Boston Red Sox and Philadelphia Phillies—was hired as the new pitching coach, while Perry Hill became the first base coach. On November 24, the Pirates signed Dinesh Patel and Rinku Singh of India. The pair participated in the Million Dollar Arm, a contest held in their home country to discover who out of the 30,000 contestants had the strongest, most accurate arm. Having never heard of baseball prior to 2007, both Patel and Singh can throw over 90 mph. The pair will participate at spring training. Management plans to keep closer observations of players' off-season workouts.

Pirates' radio announcer of 33 years, Lanny Frattare, retired prior to the season. Tim Neverett, formerly of Fox Sports Rocky Mountain, was selected to replace him after a search of approximately 200 candidates. In January 2009, the team held its sixth PirateFest at the David L. Lawrence Convention Center. The three-day event was attended by 15,127 people, and increased the number of season ticket packages purchased from the 2008 season. President Frank Coonelly stated that the team had fallen behind the Pittsburgh Steelers and Pittsburgh Penguins from a "marketing and business perspective", but are "...working hard to get ourselves back up to where we belong both in Major League Baseball and Pittsburgh." The Pirates added sleeves to their uniform, and added an alternate uniform with a gold-colored P on the chest which will be worn during select games.

Spring training 

The Pirates pre-season schedule consisted of 35 games in Bradenton, Florida, including two evening games and a game against the Netherlands national baseball team. When pitchers and catchers reported on February 13, three of twelve pitching positions were set: starter Paul Maholm, set-up man John Grabow, and closer Matt Capps. The Pirates entered spring training with 21 of 40 different players from 2008 spring training; among those were Eric Hinske, Ramón Vázquez, and Jason Jaramillo who were acquired during the off-season. Beginning March 5, Ian Snell, Ramón Vázquez, and John Grabow represented their countries in the 2009 World Baseball Classic. The Pirates finished spring training with a 17–15 record. "It gives us some confidence", said John Russell, "We worked hard all spring." The Pirates opening day salary was US$50,984,000. The Pirates finalized their opening day roster two days prior to the season opener (asterisk noting new players for the 2009 season):

Infielders
Luis Cruz
Adam LaRoche
Andy LaRoche
Freddy Sanchez
Ramón Vázquez*
Jack Wilson

Outfielders
Eric Hinske*
Nate McLouth
Craig Monroe*
Nyjer Morgan
Brandon Moss

Catchers
Ryan Doumit
Jason Jaramillo*
Starting pitchers
Zach Duke
Jeff Karstens
Paul Maholm
Ross Ohlendorf
Ian Snell

Relief pitchers
Sean Burnett
Matt Capps
Jesse Chavez
John Grabow
Craig Hansen
Donnie Veal*
Tyler Yates

Regular season

April 

The Pirates opened the season with a 6–4 win over the St. Louis Cardinals, scoring four runs in the final inning to win their third consecutive come-from-behind opening day game. The Pirates had 17 hits two games later to beat the Cardinals 7–4, but were held to one hit the next day and split their opening series two games to two. Rain shortened the Pirates' series in Cincinnati to two games; Pittsburgh won the first game 10–2 after Ryan Doumit hit his first career grand slam in the final inning. On April 13, the Pirates completed the league's first triple play of the season and the Pirates' first in 16 years; however, they lost the game 2–0. In the team's home opener on April 13, Zach Duke pitched a complete game shutout, as the Pirates defeated the Houston Astros, 7–0. In the game, both the Pirates and the Astros wore Pittsburgh Police hats in honor of three officers who were shot and killed on April 4. The pre-game ceremonies honored the officers, as well as former Pirates pitcher and current broadcaster Steve Blass for this 50th season with the team, and included a flyover by four Apache helicopters from the 1/104th Attack Reconnaissance Battalion of the Pennsylvania Army National Guard. In the first Saturday afternoon game in Pittsburgh since 2005, Craig Monroe hit two three-run home runs in consecutive innings to give the Pirates their first back-to-back victories of the season. On April 21, catcher Ryan Doumit announced that surgery was needed to fix a broken bone in his wrist, and that he would miss eight to ten weeks. Later in the day, the Pirates beat the Florida Marlins 3–2, taking them two games above .500 since the first series of the 2007 season. The following day the Pirates swept the Marlins for the first time since 2005, giving Pittsburgh their best start through 15 games since 2002. The Pirates took two games out of three against the San Diego Padres, before closing April by getting swept by the Milwaukee Brewers. Andy LaRoche hit safely in a career high 11 games during the later part of the month.

Pittsburgh finished the month with an 11–10 record—the first time since 2002 that the team was over .500 at April's end. The team was tied for third place in the NL Central division, four games behind the St. Louis Cardinals, who finished the month with the league's best record. The pitching staff posted a league-low 3.41 earned run average (ERA), due in part to first-year pitching coach Joe Kerrigan teaching pitchers to base pitches on hitters' tendencies.

May 
The Cincinnati Reds defeated the Pirates in two games out of three at PNC Park to open May. The concluding two games of the homestand saw the Pirates lose their 16 and 17th consecutive games to the Milwaukee Brewers—the second longest streak of any team over another in MLB history. The Pirates were swept during a two-game series in St. Louis—the losses extended Pittsburgh's losing streak to five consecutive road games and nine out of their past ten overall. The Pirates were swept by the New York Mets in their first series at New York's Citi Field, extending their losing streak to eight consecutive games. The Pirates returned home to defeat the St. Louis Cardinals in two out of three games. On May 13, Adam LaRoche became the first player in MLB history to have a home run taken away due to instant replay, during a procedure put into effect in August 2008. The Pirates concluded their homestand by taking two games out of three against the Colorado Rockies—finishing their homestand with a 4–2 record. In the final game of the Rockies's series Pittsburgh scored ten runs in one inning for the first time since August 2003. The Pirates won three out of four games against the Washington Nationals, extending their winning streak to five games. The Pirates continued their road trip with six games in Chicago—becoming the first team in MLB history to play the Cubs and White Sox in back-to-back series since interleague play began in 1997. After losing their first two games of the first interleague series of the season against the White Sox, Jack Wilson hit his first home run of the year to tie the final game of the series with two outs in the final inning; Nyjer Morgan scored the winning run later in the inning. On May 25, Freddy Sanchez became the first Pirate to acquire six hits in one game since Wally Backman in 1990, as the Pirates defeated the Cubs. The Pirates lost two out of three games against the Cubs, scoring a total of three runs in their losses. The Pirates concluded the month by losing two games out of three to the Houston Astros. Nate McLouth hit a home run to lead off the final game of the month, but the Pirates score any other runs, losing 2–1. Throughout May the Pirates accumulated an 11–17 record, finishing 20–28 overall for the season. The team was in fifth place in the National League Central division.

June 
The Pirates began the month with a four-game series against the New York Mets, although it was shortened to three games when the June 3 game was postponed. The Pirates won all three games that were played. On June 4, the Pirates traded All Star Nate McLouth to the Atlanta Braves for three minor league players, including future starting pitcher Charlie Morton. Later in the day, the team promoted outfielder Andrew McCutchen from AAA Indianapolis, who became the team's regular starting center fielder. The Pirates then dropped two of three to the Astros in Houston, and two of four to the Atlanta Braves before returning home for the start of Interleague play. They took two games from the Tigers before going on another road series, first to Minnesota (where they only won one game), and then to Colorado (where they were swept). They then came back home to win two of three against both the Cleveland Indians and the Kansas City Royals. In the game against the Royals on June 26, starting pitcher Virgil Vasquez earned his first win in his major league debut. The Pirates then played a three-game series against Chicago which stretched into July, which they lost two games to three. On June 30, starting center fielder Nyjer Morgan and relief pitcher Sean Burnett were traded to the Washington Nationals in exchange for Lastings Milledge and Joel Hanrahan. Hanrahan was put on the starting roster immediately, but Milledge was forced to go through a series of rehab-starts in AAA Indianapolis before being called up, due to an existing injury. During this month, the city's National Hockey League team, the Penguins, won the Stanley Cup, which coupled with the team's struggles and the National Football League's Steelers winning the Super Bowl back in February, led to a running joke that dubbed the city to be the "City of Champions. And the Pirates".

July
The Pirates lost the first game of the month against the Cubs, then played the Mets in the make-up of the postponed June 3 game. They lost 9–8 in 10 innings, despite having tied up the game off of All-Star closer Francisco Rodríguez. The Pirates then went to Florida to face the Marlins, and lost two games to three. They fared no better on their trip to Houston, where they also won only one game, and then they were swept by the Phillies in their next series.  On July 17, in the first of a three-game series against the San Francisco Giants, reliever Evan Meek picked up his first win of the season in a 14-inning game. They also won the next game, though they would lose the series finale. On July 20, in the first of a three-game series against the Brewers, the benches were cleared in the eighth inning when Milwaukee pitcher Chris Smith hit Pittsburgh reliever Jeff Karstens with a pitch. The Pirates won that game 8–5, and the series 2–1. Their next road trip took them to Atlanta, where they dropped three of five, and then to San Francisco, where they were swept. Before the final game of the series on July 29, the Pirates traded veteran shortstop Jack Wilson to the Seattle Mariners in exchange for future starting shortstop Ronny Cedeño and four Minor League players. After the game, the Pirates traded three-time All-Star second baseman Freddy Sanchez to the Giants for minor league pitcher Tim Alderson. On July 31, the Pirates returned home for a four-game series against the Nationals which stretched into August.

August
Though they won the games on both July 31 and August 1, the Pirates lost the next two games to split the series 2–2. This started an eight-game losing streak, against the Nationals, the Diamondbacks, and the Cardinals, which ended August 11 when the Pirates defeated the Rockies in Colorado. They lost the next two against the Rockies, and the next two against the Cubs. The August 16 game in Chicago was postponed because of rain. Returning home, the Pirates swept the Brewers and took two of three from the Reds and Phillies. The Pirates didn't win a game the rest of the month, being swept by the Brewers and the Reds in a series stretching into September.

September
The Pirates opened the month of September losing both games in a doubleheader against the Reds. They then returned home to play the Cardinals, against whom they won one game out of three. They then lost the first game of a three-game series against the Cubs, giving them their 82nd loss, and setting the record for most consecutive losing seasons in any sport since the 1933–1948 Philadelphia Phillies.

Game log

|- style="background:#cfc;"
| 1 || April 6 || @ Cardinals || 6–4 || Grabow (1–0) || Motte || Capps (1) || 45,832 || 1–0
|- style="background:#fbb;"
| 2 || April 7 || @ Cardinals || 3–9 || Lohse || Snell (0–1) || — || 35,206 || 1–1
|- style="background:#cfc;"
| 3 || April 8 || @ Cardinals || 7–4 || Duke (1–0) || Wellemeyer || Capps (2) || 35,535 || 2–1
|- style="background:#fbb;"
| 4 || April 9 || @ Cardinals || 1–2 || Carpenter || Ohlendorf (0–1) || Reyes || 35,293 || 2–2
|- style="background:#bbb;"
| — || April 10 || @ Reds || colspan=6| Postponed Rescheduled for August 31
|- style="background:#cfc;"
| 5 || April 11 || @ Reds || 10–2 || Maholm (1–0) || Cueto || — || 22,276 || 3–2
|- style="background:#fbb;"
| 6 || April 12 || @ Reds || 0–2 || Harang || Snell (0–2) || — || 12,876 || 3–3
|- style="background:#cfc;"
| 7 || April 13 || Astros || 7–0 || Duke (2–0) || Moehler || — || 38,411 || 4–3
|- style="background:#fbb;"
| 8 || April 15 || Astros || 1–4 || Hampton || Ohlendorf (0–2) || — || 20,690 || 4–4
|- style="background:#fbb;"
| 9 || April 16 || Astros || 3–6 || Wright || Burnett (0–1) || Hawkins || 13,877 || 4–5
|- style="background:#cfc;"
| 10 || April 17 || Braves || 3–0 || Maholm (2–0) || Jurrjens || Capps (3) || 15,659 || 5–5
|- style="background:#cfc;"
| 11 || April 18 || Braves || 10–0 || Snell (1–2) || Reyes || — || 20,755 || 6–5
|- style="background:#fbb;"
| 12 || April 19 || Braves || 1–11 || Vazquez || Duke (2–1) || — || 14,776 || 6–6
|- style="background:#cfc;"
| 13 || April 20 || Marlins || 8–0 || Ohlendorf (1–2) || Miller || — || 8,790 || 7–6
|- style="background:#cfc;"
| 14 || April 21 || Marlins || 3–2 || Karstens (1–0) || Sanchez || Capps (4) || 9,917 || 8–6
|- style="background:#cfc;"
| 15 || April 22 || Marlins || 7–4 || Maholm (3–0) || Nolasco || Capps (5) || 10,655 || 9–6
|- style="background:#fbb;"
| 16 || April 24 || @ Padres || 3–4 (11) || Moreno || Capps (0–1) || — || 25,601 || 9–7
|- style="background:#cfc;"
| 17 || April 25 || @ Padres || 10–1 || Duke (3–1) || Hill || — || 41,665 || 10–7
|- style="background:#cfc;"
| 18 || April 26 || @ Padres || 8–3 || Ohlendorf (2–2) || Peavy || — || 30,848 || 11–7
|- style="background:#fbb;"
| 19 || April 27 || @ Brewers || 5–10 || Coffey || Yates (0–1) || — || 32,198 || 11–8
|- style="background:#fbb;"
| 20 || April 28 || @ Brewers || 5–6 || Julio || Chavez (0–1) || Hoffman || 26,594 || 11–9
|- style="background:#fbb;"
| 21 || April 29 || @ Brewers || 0–1 || Gallardo || Snell (1–3) || Villanueva || 29,791 || 11–10
|-

|- style="background:#fbb;"
| 22 || May 1 || Reds || 0–4 || Arroyo || Duke (3–2) || — || 14,238 || 11–11
|- style="background:#cfc;"
| 23 || May 2 || Reds || 8–6 || Ohlendorf (3–2) || Owings || — || 22,891 || 12–11
|- style="background:#fbb;"
| 24 || May 3 || Reds || 0–5 || Cueto || Karstens (1–1) || — || 13,670 || 12–12
|- style="background:#fbb;"
| 25 || May 4 || Brewers || 4–7 || DiFelice || Capps (0–2) || Hoffman || 8,482 || 12–13
|- style="background:#fbb;"
| 26 || May 5 || Brewers || 5–8 || Suppan || Snell (1–4) || Villanueva || 9,775 || 12–14
|- style="background:#fbb;"
| 27 || May 6 || @ Cardinals || 2–4 || McClellan || Duke (3–3) || Franklin || 36,188 || 12–15
|- style="background:#fbb;"
| 28 || May 7 || @ Cardinals || 2–5 || Wellemeyer || Ohlendorf (3–3) || Franklin || 41,928 || 12–16
|- style="background:#fbb;"
| 29 || May 8 || @ Mets || 3–7 || Parnell || Yates (0–2) || — || 38,496 || 12–17
|- style="background:#fbb;"
| 30 || May 9 || @ Mets || 1–10 || Maine || Maholm (3–1) || — || 39,769 || 12–18
|- style="background:#fbb;"
| 31 || May 10 || @ Mets || 4–8 || Hernandez || Snell (1–5) || — || 39,871 || 12–19
|- style="background:#cfc;"
| 32 || May 12 || Cardinals || 7–1 || Duke (4–3) || Wellemeyer || — || 11,718 || 13–19
|- style="background:#cfc;"
| 33 || May 13 || Cardinals || 5–2 || Ohlendorf (4–3) || Piñeiro || Capps (6) || 10,494 || 14–19
|- style="background:#fbb;"
| 34 || May 14 || Cardinals || 1–5 || Miller || Karstens (1–2) || — || 12,347 || 14–20
|- style="background:#fbb;"
| 35 || May 15 || Rockies || 1–3 || Embree || Capps (0–3) || Street || 17,179 || 14–21
|- style="background:#cfc;"
| 36 || May 16 || Rockies || 7–4 || Burnett (1–1) || Belisle || Capps (7) || 24,496 || 15–21
|- style="background:#cfc;"
| 37 || May 17 || Rockies || 11–4 || Duke (5–3) || Embree || — || 14,545 || 16–21
|- style="background:#cfc;"
| 38 || May 18 || @ Nationals || 12–7 || Ohlendorf (5–3) || Mock || — || 14,549 || 17–21
|- style="background:#cfc;"
| 39 || May 19 || @ Nationals || 8–5 (10) || Gorzelanny (1–0) || Beimel || — || 18,579 || 18–21
|- style="background:#cfc;"
| 40 || May 20 || @ Nationals || 2–1 || Grabow (2–0) || Hanrahan || Capps (8) || 17,854 || 19–21
|- style="background:#fbb;"
| 41 || May 21 || @ Nationals || 4–5 || Tavarez || Gorzelanny (1–1) || Hanrahan || 17,816 || 19–22
|- style="background:#fbb;"
| 42 || May 22 || @ White Sox || 0–2 || Floyd || Duke (5–4) || Jenks || 23,347 || 19–23
|- style="background:#fbb;"
| 43 || May 23 || @ White Sox || 0–4 || Richard || Ohlendorf (5–4) || — || 32,389 || 19–24
|- style="background:#cfc;"
| 44 || May 24 || @ White Sox || 4–3 || Grabow (3–0) || Jenks || Capps (9) || 28,309 || 20–24
|- style="background:#cfc;"
| 45 || May 25 || @ Cubs || 10–8 || Gorzelanny (2–1) || Cotts || Burnett (1) || 38,942 || 21–24
|- style="background:#fbb;"
| 46 || May 26 || @ Cubs || 1–6 (5) || Marshall || Snell (1–6) || — || 38,303 || 21–25
|- style="background:#fbb;"
| 47 || May 27 || @ Cubs || 2–5 || Marmol || Chavez (0–2) || Gregg || 38,314 || 21–26
|- style="background:#fbb;"
| 48 || May 29 || Astros || 1–6 || Moehler || Ohlendorf (5–5) || — || 18,236 || 21–27
|- style="background:#cfc;"
| 49 || May 30 || Astros || 7–4 || Karstens (2–2) || Rodriguez || Capps (10) || 37,167 || 22–27
|- style="background:#fbb;"
| 50 || May 31 || Astros || 1–2 || Hampton || Maholm (3–2) || Hawkins || 19,566 || 22–28
|-

|- style="background:#cfc;"
| 51 || June 1 || Mets || 8–5 || Gorzelanny (3–1) || Putz || Capps (11) || 11,812 || 23–28
|- style="background:#cfc;"
| 52 || June 2 || Mets || 3–1 || Duke (6–4) || Santana || Capps (12) || 10,459 || 24–28
|- style="background:#bbb;"
| — || June 3 || @ Mets || colspan=6| Postponed Rescheduled for July 2
|- style="background:#cfc;"
| 53 || June 4 || Mets || 11–6 || Jackson (1–0) || Pelfrey || — || 20,683 || 25–28
|- style="background:#fbb;"
| 54 || June 5 || @ Astros || 1–9 || Hampton || Karstens (2–3) || — || 26,222 || 25–29
|- style="background:#cfc;"
| 55 || June 6 || @ Astros || 6–4 || Maholm (4–2) || Oswalt || Capps (13) || 26,099 || 26–29
|- style="background:#fbb;"
| 56 || June 7 || @ Astros || 4–6 || Fulchino || Jackson (1–1) || Hawkins || 25,729 || 26–30
|- style="background:#fbb;"
| 57 || June 8 || @ Braves || 6–7 (15) || Medlen || Karstens (2–4) || — || 21,856 || 26–31
|- style="background:#fbb;"
| 58 || June 9 || @ Braves || 3–4 || Lowe || Burnett (1–2) || Soriano || 20,124 || 26–32
|- style="background:#cfc;"
| 59 || June 10 || @ Braves || 3–2 || Karstens (3–4) || Jurrjens || Capps (14) || 21,610 || 27–32
|- style="background:#cfc;"
| 60 || June 11 || @ Braves || 3–1 || Jackson (2–1) || Soriano || Capps (15) || 29,331 || 28–32
|- style="background:#fbb;"
| 61 || June 12 || Tigers || 1–3 || Porcello || Snell (1–7) || Rodney || 18,369 || 28–33
|- style="background:#cfc;"
| 62 || June 13 || Tigers || 9–3 || Duke (7–4) || Galarraga || — || 31,411 || 29–33
|- style="background:#cfc;"
| 63 || June 14 || Tigers || 6–3 || Ohlendorf (6–5) || Willis || Capps (16) || 27,565 || 30–33
|- style="background:#fbb;"
| 64 || June 16 || @ Twins || 2–8 || Perkins || Maholm (4–3) || — || 25,351 || 30–34
|- style="background:#cfc;"
| 65 || June 17 || @ Twins || 8–2 || Snell (2–7) || Liriano || — || 30,057 || 31–34
|- style="background:#fbb;"
| 66 || June 18 || @ Twins || 1–5 || Blackburn || Duke (7–5) || — || 30,670 || 31–35
|- style="background:#fbb;"
| 67 || June 19 || @ Rockies || 3–7 || Marquis || Ohlendorf (6–6) || — || 31,248 || 31–36
|- style="background:#fbb;"
| 68 || June 20 || @ Rockies || 7–9 || Street || Chavez (0–3) || — || 32,137 || 31–37
|- style="background:#fbb;"
| 69 || June 21 || @ Rockies || 4–5 || De La Rosa || Maholm (4–4) || Street || 44,131 || 31–38
|- style="background:#fbb;"
| 70 || June 23 || Indians || 4–5 || Huff || Snell (2–8) || Wood || 19,109 || 31–39
|- style="background:#cfc;"
| 71 || June 24 || Indians || 10–6 || Duke (8–5) || Pavano || — || 20,162 || 32–39
|- style="background:#cfc;"
| 72 || June 25 || Indians || 3–2 || Capps (1–3) || Herges || — || 30,120 || 33–39
|- style="background:#cfc;"
| 73 || June 26 || Royals || 5–3 || Vasquez (1–0) || Meche || Capps (17) || 18,458 || 34–39
|- style="background:#cfc;"
| 74 || June 27 || Royals || 6–2 || Maholm (5–4) || Chen || — || 36,032 || 35–39
|- style="background:#fbb;"
| 75 || June 28 || Royals || 2–3 || Greinke || Morton (0–1) || Soria || 25,888 || 35–40
|- style="background:#fbb;"
| 76 || June 29 || Cubs || 1–3 || Harden || Duke (8–6) || Gregg || 15,400 || 35–41
|- style="background:#cfc;"
| 77 || June 30 || Cubs || 3–0 || Ohlendorf (7–6) || Lilly || Capps (18) || 17,054 || 36–41
|-

|- style="background:#fbb;"
| 78 || July 1 || Cubs || 1–4 || Wells || Vasquez (1–1) || Gregg || 15,770 || 36–42
|- style="background:#fbb;"
| 79 || July 2 || Mets || 8–9 (10) || Rodriguez || Capps (1–4) || — || 14,321 || 36–43
|- style="background:#cfc;"
| 80 || July 3 || @ Marlins || 7–4 || Morton (1–1) || Volstad || — || 16,114 || 37–43
|- style="background:#fbb;"
| 81 || July 4 || @ Marlins || 3–5 || Miller || Duke (8–7) || Meyer || 25,303 || 37–44
|- style="background:#fbb;"
| 82 || July 5 || @ Marlins || 0–5 || Nolasco || Ohlendorf (7–7) || — || 13,287 || 37–45
|- style="background:#fbb;"
| 83 || July 6 || @ Astros || 1–4 || Hampton || Vasquez (1–2) || Valverde || 26,834 || 37–46
|- style="background:#cfc;"
| 84 || July 7 || @ Astros || 6–3 || Maholm (6–4) || Moehler || Capps (19) || 27,142 || 38–46
|- style="background:#fbb;"
| 85 || July 8 || @ Astros || 0–5 || Rodriguez || Morton (1–2) || — || 29,243 || 38–47
|- style="background:#fbb;"
| 86 || July 10 || @ Phillies || 2–3 || Blanton || Duke (8–8) || Lidge || 45,246 || 38–48
|- style="background:#fbb;"
| 87 || July 11 || @ Phillies || 7–8 || Walker || Capps (1–5) || — || 45,209 || 38–49
|- style="background:#fbb;"
| 88 || July 12 || @ Phillies || 2–5 || Happ || Vasquez (1–3) || — || 45,245 || 38–50
|- style="background:#cfc;"
| 89 || July 17 || Giants || 2–1 (14) || Meek (1–0) || Howry || — || 26,709 || 39–50
|- style="background:#cfc;"
| 90 || July 18 || Giants || 2–0 || Morton (2–2) || Zito || Capps (20) || 37,023 || 40–50
|- style="background:#fbb;"
| 91 || July 19 || Giants || 3–4 || Cain || Duke (8–9) || Wilson || 24,842 || 40–51
|- style="background:#cfc;"
| 92 || July 20 || Brewers || 8–5 || Ohlendorf (8–7) || Burns || — || 11,471 || 41–51
|- style="background:#fbb;"
| 93 || July 21 || Brewers || 0–2 || Looper || Vasquez (1–4) || Hoffman || 16,184 || 41–52
|- style="background:#cfc;"
| 94 || July 22 || Brewers || 8–7 || Capps (2–5) || Stetter || — || 21,186 || 42–52
|- style="background:#fbb;"
| 95 || July 23 || @ Diamondbacks || 4–11 || Gutierrez || Meek (1–1) || — || 24,008 || 42–53
|- style="background:#cfc;"
| 96 || July 24 || @ Diamondbacks || 10–3 || Duke (9–9) || Petit || — || 24,911 || 43–53
|- style="background:#fbb;"
| 97 || July 25 || @ Diamondbacks || 0–7 || Davis || Ohlendorf (8–8) || — || 26,037 || 43–54
|- style="background:#fbb;"
| 98 || July 26 || @ Diamondbacks || 0–9 || Scherzer || Vasquez (1–5) || — || 27,507 || 43–55
|- style="background:#fbb;"
| 99 || July 27 || @ Giants || 2–4 || Lincecum || Maholm (6–5) || — || 40,008 || 43–56
|- style="background:#fbb;"
| 100 || July 28 || @ Giants || 2–3 || Romo || Morton (2–3) || Wilson || 35,972 || 43–57
|- style="background:#fbb;"
| 101 || July 29 || @ Giants || 0–1 (10) || Wilson || Capps (2–6) || — || 37,582 || 43–58
|- style="background:#cfc;"
| 102 || July 31 || Nationals || 5–4 || Ohlendorf (9–8) || Lannan || Capps (21) || 23,363 || 44–58
|-

|- style="background:#cfc;"
| 103 || August 1 || Nationals || 11–6 || Vasquez (2–5) || Stammen || — || 26,855 || 45–58
|- style="background:#fbb;"
| 104 || August 2 || Nationals || 3–5 || Burnett || Maholm (6–6) || MacDougal || 21,894 || 45–59
|- style="background:#fbb;"
| 105 || August 3 || Nationals || 4–8 || Clippard || Morton (2–4) || MacDougal || 11,630 || 45–60
|- style="background:#fbb;"
| 106 || August 4 || Diamondbacks || 0–6 || Petit || Duke (9–10) || — || 11,294 || 45–61
|- style="background:#fbb;"
| 107 || August 5 || Diamondbacks || 3–4 || Davis || Hanrahan (0–1) || Qualls || 11,470 || 45–62
|- style="background:#fbb;"
| 108 || August 6 || Diamondbacks || 6–11 (12) || Rauch || Jackson (2–2) || — || 17,311 || 45–63
|- style="background:#fbb;"
| 109 || August 7 || Cardinals || 4–6 || Carpenter || Ascanio (0–1) || Franklin || 24,854 || 45–64
|- style="background:#fbb;"
| 110 || August 8 || Cardinals || 3–5 || Wainwright || Morton (2–5) || Franklin || 38,593 || 45–65
|- style="background:#fbb;"
| 111 || August 9 || Cardinals || 3–7 || Piñeiro || Capps (2–7) || McClellan || 24,369 || 45–66
|- style="background:#cfc;"
| 112 || August 11 || @ Rockies || 7–3 || Ohlendorf (10–8) || Chacin || — || 35,212 || 46–66
|- style="background:#fbb;"
| 113 || August 12 || @ Rockies || 0–8 || Jimenez || Hart (0–1) || — || 29,430 || 46–67
|- style="background:#fbb;"
| 114 || August 13 || @ Rockies || 1–10 || Marquis || Maholm (6–7) || — || 27,619 || 46–68
|- style="background:#fbb;"
| 115 || August 14 || @ Cubs || 2–17 || Wells || Morton (2–6) || — || 41,619 || 46–69
|- style="background:#fbb;"
| 116 || August 15 || @ Cubs || 1–3 || Gorzelanny || Duke (9–11) || Gregg || 41,197 || 46–70
|- style="background:#bbb;"
| — || August 16|| @ Cubs || colspan=6| Postponed Rescheduled for September 30
|- style="background:#cfc;"
| 117 || August 17 || Brewers || 9–5 || Hart (1–1) || Villanueva || — || 12,478 || 47–70
|- style="background:#cfc;"
| 118 || August 18 || Brewers || 5–2 || Ohlendorf (11–8) || Parra || — || 12,188 || 48–70
|- style="background:#cfc;"
| 119 || August 19 || Brewers || 3–1 || Maholm (7–7) || Gallardo || Capps (22) || 12,630 || 49–70
|- style="background:#cfc;"
| 120 || August 21 || Reds || 5–2 || Morton (3–6) || Owings || Capps (23) || 22,725 || 50–70
|- style="background:#cfc;"
| 121 || August 22 || Reds || 12–2 || Duke (10–11) || Lehr || — || 32,570 || 51–70
|- style="background:#fbb;"
| 122 || August 23 || Reds || 1–4 || Bailey || Hart (1–2) || Cordero || 21,209 || 51–71
|- style="background:#cfc;"
| 123 || August 25 || Phillies || 6–4 || Capps (3–7) || Lidge || — || 17,049 || 52–71
|- style="background:#fbb;"
| 124 || August 26 || Phillies || 1–4 (10) || Madson || Jackson (2–3) || — || 17,403 || 52–72
|- style="background:#cfc;"
| 125 || August 27 || Phillies || 3–2 || Bautista (1–0) || Happ || Capps (24) || 24,470 || 53–72
|- style="background:#fbb;"
| 126 || August 28 || @ Brewers || 6–8 || Parra || Duke (10–12) || Hoffman || 34,438 || 53–73
|- style="background:#fbb;"
| 127 || August 29 || @ Brewers || 3–7 || Vargas || Hart (1–3) || — || 41,773 || 53–74
|- style="background:#fbb;"
| 128 || August 30 || @ Brewers || 1–4 || Suppan || Ohlendorf (11–9) || Hoffman || 41,157 || 53–75
|- style="background:#fbb;"
| 129 || August 31 || @ Reds || 3–4 || Masset || Chavez (0–4) || — || 13,051 || 53–76
|- style="background:#fbb;"
| 130 || August 31 || @ Reds || 3–6 || Cueto || Maholm (7–8) || Cordero || 9,087 || 53–77
|-

|- style="background:#fbb;"
| 131 || September 1 || @ Reds || 5–11 || Lehr || Morton (3–7) || Owings || 10,304 || 53–78
|- style="background:#fbb;"
| 132 || September 2 || @ Reds || 3–5 || Bailey || Duke (10–13) || Cordero || 11,541 || 53–79
|- style="background:#fbb;"
| 133 || September 4 || Cardinals || 7–14 || Wainwright || Hart (1–4) || — || 15,258 || 53–80
|- style="background:#fbb;"
| 134 || September 5 || Cardinals || 1–2 (10) || Hawksworth || Capps (3–8) || Franklin || 27,071 || 53–81
|- style="background:#cfc;"
| 135 || September 6 || Cardinals || 6–5 || Chavez (1–4) || Franklin || — || 19,274 || 54–81
|- style="background:#fbb;"
| 136 || September 7 || Cubs || 2–4 || Lilly || McCutchen (0–1) || Marmol || 14,673 || 54–82
|- style="background:#fbb;"
| 137 || September 8 || Cubs || 4–9 || Dempster || Duke (10–14) || — || 17,862 || 54–83
|- style="background:#fbb;"
| 138 || September 9 || Cubs || 5–8 || Zambrano || Hart (1–5) || Marmol || 10,899 || 54–84
|- style="background:#fbb;"
| 139 || September 11 || @ Astros || 1–9 || Norris || Morton (3–8) || — || 31,302 || 54–85
|- style="background:#fbb;"
| 140 || September 12 || @ Astros || 2–4 || Fulchino || Ohlendorf (11–10) || Valverde || 35,213 || 54–86
|- style="background:#cfc;"
| 141 || September 13 || @ Astros || 2–1 || Maholm (8–8) || Paulino || Capps (25) || 34,405 || 55–86
|- style="background:#fbb;"
| 142 || September 14 || @ Dodgers || 2–6 || Garland || McCutchen (0–2) || — || 42,045 || 55–87
|- style="background:#fbb;"
| 143 || September 15 || @ Dodgers || 4–5 (13) || Belisario || Dumatrait (0–1) || — || 52,562 || 55–88
|- style="background:#fbb;"
| 144 || September 16 || @ Dodgers || 1–3 || Kuroda || Hart (1–6) || Broxton || 53,193 || 55–89
|- style="background:#cfc;"
| 145 || September 18 || Padres || 5–1 || Morton (4–8) || Stauffer || — || 26,178 || 56–89
|- style="background:#fbb;"
| 146 || September 19 || Padres || 1–2 || Gregerson || Dumatrait (0–2) || Bell || 20,379 || 56–90
|- style="background:#fbb;"
| 147 || September 20 || Padres || 0–4 || Correia || Maholm (8–9) || Bell || 24,028 || 56–91
|- style="background:#fbb;"
| 148 || September 21 || Padres || 6–11 (11) || Gallagher || Karstens (3–5) || — || 12,566 || 56–92
|- style="background:#fbb;"
| 149 || September 22 || Reds || 4–10 || Cueto || Duke (10–15) || — || 16,492 || 56–93
|- style="background:#fbb;"
| 150 || September 23 || Reds || 2–12 || Bailey || Hart (1–7) || — || 15,980 || 56–94
|- style="background:#fbb;"
| 151 || September 24 || Reds || 1–4 || Arroyo || Morton (4–9) || Cordero || 15,892 || 56–95
|- style="background:#cfc;"
| 152 || September 25 || Dodgers || 3–1 || Veal (1–0) || Garland || Capps (26) || 19,452 || 57–95
|- style="background:#fbb;"
| 153 || September 26 || Dodgers || 4–8 || Sherrill || Bautista (1–1) || — || 35,605 || 57–96
|- style="background:#cfc;"
| 154 || September 27 || Dodgers || 6–5 || Capps (4–8) || Broxton || — || 26,831 || 58–96
|- style="background:#cfc;"
| 155 || September 28 || Dodgers || 11–1 || Duke (11–15) || Kuroda || — || 16,696 || 59–96
|- style="background:#fbb;"
| 156 || September 29 || @ Cubs || 0–6 || Dempster || Hart (1–8) || — || 35,308 || 59–97
|- style="background:#cfc;"
| 157 || September 30 || @ Cubs || 4–0 || Morton (5–9) || Lilly || — || 34,362 || 60–97
|- style="background:#cfc;"
| 158 || September 30 || @ Cubs || 8–2 || Karstens (4–5) || Zambrano || — || 33,299 || 61–97
|-

|- style="background:#cfc;"
| 159 || October 2 || @ Reds || 3–1 || McCutchen (1–2) || Lehr || Capps (27) || 16,288 || 62–97
|- style="background:#fbb;"
| 160 || October 3 || @ Reds || 4–8 || Cueto || Duke (11–16) || — || 24,539 || 62–98
|- style="background:#fbb;"
| 161 || October 4 || @ Reds || 0–6 || Bailey || Karstens (4–6) || — || 20,940 || 62–99
|-

|-
| Legend:       = Win       = Loss       = PostponementBold = Pirates team member

Divisional standings

Record vs. opponents

Detailed records

Roster

Opening Day lineup

Awards and honors

2009 Major League Baseball All-Star Game
Freddy Sanchez, 2B, reserve
Zach Duke, P, reserve

Statistics
Hitting
Note: G = Games played; AB = At bats; H = Hits; Avg. = Batting average; HR = Home runs; RBI = Runs batted in

Pitching
Note: G = Games pitched; IP = Innings pitched; W = Wins; L = Losses; ERA = Earned run average; SO = Strikeouts

Transactions

Pre-season
(October 29, 2008 – April 4, 2009)
On December 1, 2008 the Pittsburgh Pirates lost free agent Franquelis Osoria to the Kansas City Royals.
On December 5, 2008 the Pittsburgh Pirates lost free agent Matt Kata to the Houston Astros.
On December 5, 2008 the Pittsburgh Pirates signed Boston Red Sox free agent Daniel Haigwood to a minor league contract.
On December 8, 2008 the Pittsburgh Pirates signed Cleveland Indians free agent Brian Slocum to a minor league contract.
On December 10, 2008 the Pittsburgh Pirates traded Ronny Paulino to the Philadelphia Phillies in exchange for Jason Jaramillo.
On December 11, 2008 the Pittsburgh Pirates lost Kyle Bloom to the Detroit Tigers due to the Rule 5 draft.
On December 11, 2008 the Pittsburgh Pirates acquired Donnie Veal from the Chicago Cubs due to the Rule 5 draft.
On December 12, 2008 the Pittsburgh Pirates signed free agent Ramon Vazquez to a 2-year contract.
On December 17, 2008 the Pittsburgh Pirates lost free agent Josh Shortslef to the Philadelphia Phillies.
On December 22, 2008 the Pittsburgh Pirates signed Denny Bautista, Chris Bootcheck, Garrett Jones, Juan Mateo, Andy Phillips and Jeff Salazar to Minor League contracts.
On December 22, 2008 the Pittsburgh Pirates signed Ryan Doumit to a 3-year contract extension.
On January 6, 2009 the Pittsburgh Pirates signed Eliezer Aquino, Jacobo Espiede, Sadid Pontier-Frias, Corey Hamman, Jeffrey Infante, Pedro Lopez, Anderson Machado, Leandro Mejia, Jean Ozoria, Angel Reyes, Eduardo Rodriguez, Carlos Vásquez and Jesus Vasquez to minor league contracts.
On January 6, 2009 the Pittsburgh Pirates lost free agent Ray Sadler to the Tampa Bay Rays.
On January 13, 2009 the Pittsburgh Pirates signed Craig Monroe and Miguel Pérez to minor league contracts.
On January 13, 2009 the Pittsburgh Pirates lost free agent Michael Ryan to the Florida Marlins.
On January 20, 2009 the Pittsburgh Pirates re-signed Adam LaRoche to a 1-year contract.
On January 22, 2009 the Pittsburgh Pirates lost free agent Juan Pérez to the Atlanta Braves.
On January 26, 2009 the Pittsburgh Pirates claimed Virgil Vasquez off of waivers from the San Diego Padres and signed Jason Davis and Hector Gimenez to minor league contracts.
On January 30, 2009 the Pittsburgh Pirates re-signed Paul Maholm to a 3-year contract extension and signed free agent Eric Hinske to a 1-year contract.
On February 5, 2009 the Pittsburgh Pirates lost T. J. Beam off of waivers to the Toronto Blue Jays.
On February 9, 2009 the Pittsburgh Pirates lost free agent Ronald Belisario to the Los Angeles Dodgers.
On February 17, 2009 the Pittsburgh Pirates re-signed Nate McLouth to a 3-year contract.
On February 21, 2009 the Pittsburgh Pirates exercised contract option on John Russell as manager through 2010.
On March 4, 2009 the Pittsburgh Pirates re-signed Andy LaRoche, Brandon Moss, Brian Bixler, Craig Hansen, David Davidson, Donnie Veal, Evan Meek, Jason Jaramillo, Jeff Karstens, Jeff Sues, Jesse Chavez, Jimmy Barthmaier, José Tábata, Luis Cruz, Neil Walker, Nyjer Morgan, Phil Dumatrait, Robinzon Diaz, Rómulo Sánchez, Ronald Uviedo, Ross Ohlendorf, Sean Burnett, Steve Pearce, Steve Lerud, Tom Gorzelanny and Virgil Vasquez to 1-year contracts.
On March 29, 2009 the Pittsburgh Pirates received returned Rule 5 draft pick Kyle Bloom from the Detroit Tigers.

In-Season
(April 5, 2009 – November 4, 2009)

On April 15, 2009 the Pittsburgh Pirates acquired Delwyn Young from the Los Angeles Dodgers in exchange for two players to be named later.
On April 17, 2009 the Pittsburgh Pirates acquired Mike Dubee from the Chicago White Sox in exchange for Andy Phillips.
On May 16, 2009 the Pittsburgh Pirates acquired Eric Hacker from the New York Yankees in exchange for Rómulo Sánchez.
On May 17, 2009 the Pittsburgh Pirates acquired Jeff Corsaletti from the Boston Red Sox and Randy Newsom from the Cleveland Indians in exchange for players to be named later or cash considerations.
On May 18, 2009 the Pittsburgh Pirates claimed Steven Jackson off of waivers from the New York Yankees.
On June 3, 2009 the Pittsburgh Pirates acquired Charlie Morton, Jeff Locke and Gorkys Hernández from the Atlanta Braves in exchange for Nate McLouth.
On June 30, 2009 the Pittsburgh Pirates acquired Eric Fryer and Casey Erickson from the New York Yankees in exchange for Eric Hinske.
On June 30, 2009 the Pittsburgh Pirates acquired Lastings Milledge and Joel Hanrahan from the Washington Nationals in exchange for Sean Burnett and Nyjer Morgan.
On July 22, 2009 the Pittsburgh Pirates acquired Argenis Diaz and Hunter Strickland from the Boston Red Sox in exchange for Adam LaRoche.
On July 29, 2009 the Pittsburgh Pirates acquired Tim Alderson from the San Francisco Giants in exchange for Freddy Sanchez.
On July 29, 2009 the Pittsburgh Pirates acquired Jeff Clement, Ronny Cedeño, Aaron Pribanic, Brett Lorin and Nate Adcock from the Seattle Mariners in exchange for Ian Snell and Jack Wilson.
On July 30, 2009 the Pittsburgh Pirates acquired Kevin Hart, José Ascanio and Josh Harrison from the Chicago Cubs in exchange for John Grabow and Tom Gorzelanny.
On August 12, 2009 the Pittsburgh Pirates claimed Jon Meloan off of waivers from the Tampa Bay Rays.
On September 2, 2009 the Pittsburgh Pirates lost Jon Meloan off of waivers to the Oakland Athletics.
On October 17, 2009 the Pittsburgh Pirates announced that Ray Searage was promoted to Major League coaching staff.
On October 29, 2009 the Pittsburgh Pirates claimed Justin Thomas off of waivers from the Seattle Mariners.
On October 30, 2009 the Pittsburgh Pirates named Carlos García as first base coach.
On November 3, 2009 the Pittsburgh Pirates acquired Aki Iwamura from the Tampa Bay Rays in exchange for Jesse Chavez.

Farm system

LEAGUE CHAMPIONS: Lynchburg

References

External links

2009 Pittsburgh Pirates season Official Site
2009 Pittsburgh Pirates season at Baseball Reference

Pittsburgh Pirates seasons
Pittsburgh Pirates season
Pitts